is a Japanese former wrestler who competed in the 1984 Summer Olympics, in the 1988 Summer Olympics, and in the 1992 Summer Olympics.

References

External links
 

1957 births
Living people
Olympic wrestlers of Japan
Wrestlers at the 1984 Summer Olympics
Wrestlers at the 1988 Summer Olympics
Wrestlers at the 1992 Summer Olympics
Japanese male sport wrestlers
Asian Games medalists in wrestling
Japan Ground Self-Defense Force personnel
Wrestlers at the 1986 Asian Games
Wrestlers at the 1990 Asian Games
Wrestlers at the 1994 Asian Games
Medalists at the 1986 Asian Games
Medalists at the 1990 Asian Games
Medalists at the 1994 Asian Games
Asian Games gold medalists for Japan
Asian Games bronze medalists for Japan
20th-century Japanese people
21st-century Japanese people
Asian Wrestling Championships medalists